Challis Brewery Historic District is a historic district listed on the National Register of Historic Places in 1980.

It includes four buildings from the 1879-founded Klug Brewery.  Fred Albiez, Ferdinand Klug, and George Fuchs teamed up to open the brewery;  it may have closed by 1886.

In 1980 it was claimed that there had been no operating breweries at all in Idaho for twenty years;  this brewery was deemed notable as one of only two surviving former breweries.

The main building is a  cut stone and rubble brewery building.  There are also two rubble-stone houses and a stone-walled outbuilding, and the stone foundation of another building.

References 

Historic districts on the National Register of Historic Places in Idaho
Buildings and structures completed in 1879
Custer County, Idaho